Beertema is a surname. Notable people with the surname include:

Piet Beertema (born 1943), Dutch internet pioneer
Harm Beertema (born 1952), Dutch politician and educator